KeePassXC is a free and open-source password manager. It started as a community fork of KeePassX (itself a cross-platform port of KeePass).

It is built using Qt5 libraries, making it a multi-platform application which can be run on Linux, Windows, macOS and BSD.

KeePassXC uses the KeePass 2.x (.kdbx) password database format as the native format. It can also import (and convert) version 2 and the older KeePass 1 (.kdb) databases. KeePassXC supports having key files and YubiKey challenge-response for additional security.

The Electronic Frontier Foundation mention KeePassXC as "an example of a password manager that is open-source and free." 

An accompanying browser extension is also available for Firefox, Google Chrome and Microsoft Edge.

See also 

 List of password managers
 Cryptography

References

External links 
 
 

Free password managers
Software that uses Qt